Ek Aur Sikander is a 1986 Indian Hindi-language family drama film directed by Bhaskar Shetty, starring Mithun Chakraborty, Rati Agnihotri, Anita Raj, Amrish Puri and Rakesh Roshan.

Songs

Cast

 Mithun Chakraborty as Sikandar 
 Rati Agnihotri as Doctor Anita 
 Anita Raj as Shama Khan, Daughter of Dilawar Khan
 Rakesh Roshan as Police Inspector Amar Verma 
 Amrish Puri as Sher Khan /Dilawar Khan (Dual Role)
Geeta Siddharth as Zareena, Mother of Amar
Shreeram Lagoo as Police Inspector /Police Commissioner Shashikant Verma, Father of Sikander
Tanuja as Tanu Verma
Mohan Sherry as Anita's Father
Viju Khote as Boga Seth Jewellery Owner/Trader
Jeevan as Micheal
Sujit Kumar as Gang member of,Micheal (Guest Role)
Vikas Anand as Gang member of,Micheal (Guest Role)
Mukri as Chacha
Shivraj as Anita's Patient

References

External links
 
 http://ibosnetwork.com/asp/filmbodetails.asp?id=Ek+Aur+Sikander

1986 films
1980s Hindi-language films
Indian drama films
Films scored by Rajesh Roshan
1986 drama films
Hindi-language drama films